For the Sake of Mahdi is a 2012 Iranian social drama film written, directed, and produced by Hossein Shahabi (Persian: حسین شهابی).

Background
Release of the film was banned for Seven years issued by the Government of Iran for screening film festivals.

Starring
 Mahdi Bakhtyar Nejhad
 Negin Motazedi
 Maryam Rohani 
 Iraj Moghimi
 Mohammad Karhemmat 
 Mohammad Akbari 
 Ahmad Shahabi 
 Bahareh Ansari 	
 Ali Habibpoor

Production crew
 Cinematography: Hossein Shahabi
 Sound Recorder: Mehrdad Moghimi
 Make-up: Hossein Kashani
 Production manager: Mohammad Karhemmat
 Editor: Siavash Shahabi
 Music: Hossein Shahabi 
 Costume Designer: Bahareh Ansari
 Director's Assistants: Siavash Shahabi, Bahareh Ansari

References

External links 
 Catálogo 28º, Festival Internacional de Cine de Mar del Plata
 For the Sake of Mahdi at the Iranian Movie Database
 For the Sake of Mahdi at the Internet Movie Database

2012 films
2012 independent films
2010s Persian-language films
Films set in Tehran
Films shot in Iran
Iranian independent films
Iranian drama films
2012 drama films
Films directed by Hossein Shahabi